The Sombrero Galaxy (also known as Messier Object 104, M104 or NGC 4594) is a peculiar galaxy of unclear classification in the constellation borders of Virgo and Corvus, being about  from the Milky Way galaxy. It is a member of the Virgo II Groups, a series of galaxies and galaxy clusters strung out from the southern edge of the Virgo Supercluster.

It has a bright nucleus, an unusually large central bulge, and a prominent dust lane in its outer disk, which is viewed almost edge-on. The dark dust lane and the bulge give it the appearance of a sombrero hat (thus the name). Astronomers initially thought the halo was small and light, indicative of a spiral galaxy; but the Spitzer Space Telescope found that the dust ring was larger and more massive than previously thought, indicative of a giant elliptical galaxy. 

The galaxy has an apparent magnitude of +8.0, making it easily visible with amateur telescopes, and is considered by some authors to be the galaxy with the highest absolute magnitude within a radius of 10 megaparsecs of the Milky Way. Its large bulge, central supermassive black hole, and dust lane all attract the attention of professional astronomers.

Observation history

Discovery
The Sombrero Galaxy was discovered on May 11, 1781 by Pierre Méchain, who described the object in a May 1783 letter to J. Bernoulli that was later published in the Berliner Astronomisches Jahrbuch. Charles Messier made a hand-written note about this and five other objects (now collectively recognized as M104 – M109) to his personal list of objects now known as the Messier Catalogue, but it was not "officially" included until 1921. William Herschel independently discovered the object in 1784 and additionally noted the presence of a "dark stratum" in the galaxy's disc, what is now called a dust lane. Later astronomers were able to connect Méchain's and Herschel's observations.

Designation as a Messier object
In 1921, Camille Flammarion found Messier's personal list of the Messier objects including the hand-written notes about the Sombrero Galaxy. This was identified with object 4594 in the New General Catalogue, and Flammarion declared that it should be included in the Messier Catalogue. Since this time, the Sombrero Galaxy has been known as M104.

Dust ring

As noted above, this galaxy's most striking feature is the dust lane that crosses in front of the bulge of the galaxy. This dust lane is actually a symmetrical ring that encloses the bulge of the galaxy. Most of the cold atomic hydrogen gas and the dust lie within this ring. The ring might also contain most of the Sombrero Galaxy's cold molecular gas, although this is an inference based on observations with low resolution and weak detections. Additional observations are needed to confirm that the Sombrero galaxy's molecular gas is constrained to the ring. Based on infrared spectroscopy, the dust ring is the primary site of star formation within this galaxy.

Nucleus
The nucleus of the Sombrero Galaxy is classified as a low-ionization nuclear emission-line region (LINER). These are nuclear regions where ionized gas is present, but the ions are only weakly ionized (i.e. the atoms are missing relatively few electrons). The source of energy for ionizing the gas in LINERs has been debated extensively. Some LINER nuclei may be powered by hot, young stars found in star formation regions, whereas other LINER nuclei may be powered by active galactic nuclei (highly energetic regions that contain supermassive black holes). Infrared spectroscopy observations have demonstrated that the nucleus of the Sombrero Galaxy is probably devoid of any significant star formation activity. However, a supermassive black hole has been identified in the nucleus (as discussed in the subsection below), so this active galactic nucleus is probably the energy source that weakly ionizes the gas in the Sombrero Galaxy.

Central supermassive black hole
In the 1990s, a research group led by John Kormendy demonstrated that a supermassive black hole is present within the Sombrero Galaxy. Using spectroscopy data from both the CFHT and the Hubble Space Telescope, the group showed that the speed of revolution of the stars within the center of the galaxy could not be maintained unless a mass 1 billion times that of the Sun, is present in the center. This is among the most massive black holes measured in any nearby galaxy, and is the nearest billion-solar-mass black hole to Earth.

Synchrotron radiation
At radio and X-ray wavelengths, the nucleus is a strong source of synchrotron radiation. Synchrotron radiation is produced when high-velocity electrons oscillate as they pass through regions with strong magnetic fields. This emission is quite common for active galactic nuclei. Although radio synchrotron radiation may vary over time for some active galactic nuclei, the luminosity of the radio emission from the Sombrero Galaxy varies only 10–20%.

Unidentified terahertz radiation
This terahertz radiation was found not to originate from the thermal emission from dust (which is commonly seen at infrared and submillimeter wavelengths), synchrotron radiation (which is commonly seen at radio wavelengths), bremsstrahlung emission from hot gas (which is uncommonly seen at millimeter wavelengths), or molecular gas (which commonly produces submillimeter spectral lines). The source of the terahertz radiation remains unidentified.

Globular clusters
The Sombrero Galaxy has a relatively large number of globular clusters, observational studies of which have produced population estimates in the range of 1,200 to 2,000. The ratio of globular clusters to the galaxy's total luminosity is high compared to the Milky Way and similar galaxies with small bulges, but comparable to other galaxies with large bulges. These results have often been used to demonstrate that the number of a galaxy's globular clusters is thought to be related to the size of its bulge. The surface density of the globular clusters generally follows the bulge's light profile, except near the galaxy's center.

Distance and brightness
At least two methods have been used to measure the distance to the Sombrero Galaxy.

The first method relies on comparing the measured fluxes from the galaxy's planetary nebulae to the known luminosity of planetary nebulae in the Milky Way.

The second method is the surface brightness fluctuations method, which uses the grainy appearance of the galaxy's bulge to estimate the distance to it. Nearby galaxy bulges appear very grainy, while more distant bulges appear smooth.

The galaxy's absolute magnitude (in the blue) is estimated as −21.9 at  (−21.8 at the average distance of above)—which, as stated above, makes it the brightest galaxy in a radius of  around the Milky Way.

A 2016 report used the Hubble Space Telescope to measure the distance to M104 based on the tip of the red-giant branch method, yielding 9.55 ± 0.13 ± 0.31 Mpc.

Nearby galaxies and galaxy group information
The Sombrero Galaxy lies within a complex, filament-like cloud of galaxies that extends to the south of the Virgo Cluster. However, it is unclear whether it is part of a formal galaxy group. Hierarchical methods for identifying groups, which determine group membership by considering whether individual galaxies belong to a larger aggregate of galaxies, typically produce results showing that the Sombrero Galaxy is part of a group that includes NGC 4487, NGC 4504, NGC 4802, UGCA 289, and possibly a few other galaxies. However, results that rely on the percolation method (i.e. the "friends-of-friends" method), which links individual galaxies together to determine group membership, indicate that either the Sombrero Galaxy is not in a group or that it may be only part of a galaxy pair with UGCA 287.

Besides that, M104 is also accompanied by an ultra-compact dwarf galaxy, discovered in 2009, with an absolute magnitude of −12.3, an effective radius of just , and a mass of 3.3×

Amateur astronomy

The Sombrero Galaxy is 11.5° west of Spica and 5.5° north-east of Eta Corvi. Although it is visible with 7×35 binoculars or a  amateur telescope, an  telescope is needed to distinguish the bulge from the disk, and a 10- or 12-inch (250 or 300 mm) telescope to see the dark dust lane.

See also
 List of Messier objects
 Lists of astronomical objects
 NGC 1291, a galaxy with an outer dust ring
 NGC 4725, a similar galaxy with an extended dust ring
 NGC 6027a, a member of Seyfert's Sextet with a very similar dust ring structure
 NGC 7742, a spiral galaxy with a similar dust ring
 NGC 7814, a galaxy sometimes referred to as "the little sombrero"
 Ring galaxy
 Messier object
 New General Catalogue

Notes

References

External links

 
 Hubble Mosaic of the Majestic Sombrero Galaxy (ESA)
 HubbleSite: The Majestic Sombrero Galaxy (M104)
 M104, the Sombrero Galaxy (NightSkyInfo.com)
 Messier 104 (SEDS)
 Sombrero Galaxy: A Great Observatories View
 M104 The Sombrero Galaxy
 
 Sombrero Galaxy (Messier 104) at Constellation Guide

Elliptical galaxies
Spiral galaxies
LINER galaxies
Virgo (constellation)
Messier objects
NGC objects
42407
17810511
Discoveries by Pierre Méchain
Peculiar galaxies
UGCA objects